Baptiste Roux (born 26 November 1999) is a French professional footballer who plays as a midfielder for Ligue 2 club EA Guingamp.

Career

Early life and youth career 
Roux was born on 26 November 1999 in Pouzauges, France. Roux did his youth career football in the academy of Guingamp.

Guingamp B 
Roux signed his first senior contract with the B team of EA Guingamp in 2017. He made his debut on 28 April 2018 against Vannes OC. Baptiste started in the lineup for the match and was substituted in the 57th minute for Romain Le Méhauté. The match ended in a 1–1 draw. Roux played his last match of the season against the B team of US Concarneau on 21 April 2018 which ended 3–0 in favor of Guingamp.

Roux played his first match of the new season on 1 September 2018 against Stade Plabennécois which he played as a substitute for Matthias Phaëton during the 89th minute of the match. The game ended 2–1, Guingamp clinching the three points. Roux scored his debut goal for the club on 20 October 2018 in the match against Stade Pontivy during the 14th minute of the game. The match ended 2–0 in favor of Guingamp. Roux played his last match of the season against US Montagnarde on 20 April 2019 which ended with a score line of 2–0 with Guingamp taking the win.

Roux played his first match of the season against Vannes OC on 7 September 2019 which ended 4–1 with Guingamp losing the game. Roux scored his first goal of the season against US Saint-Malo on 19 October 2019 in the 47th minute of the game which ended in a 1–1 draw. Roux found his second goal of the season against AS Poissy on 14 December 2019. The match ended with a score line of 3–5 with Guingamp taking the three points. Roux played his last match of the season against US Granville on 7 March 2020 which ended 1–2 with Guingamp losing the match.

Roux played just one match in the season against the B team of Caen on 22 August 2020 where he scored a goal in the 88th minute. The match ended 3–1 in favor Guingamp. He was then promoted to the senior team in the middle of the season.

Guingamp 
Roux signed his first pro contract and was promoted to the senior team of Guingamp from the reserve team in middle of the new season. Roux penned a three-year contract with the club. Roux made his debut against Pau FC on 19 September 2020. Roux was started as a substitute for Gueïda Fofana during the 74th minute of the game. The match ended 1–0 for Guingamp. He scored his debut goal for the senior team on 30 January 2021 in the second match of the season against Pau FC, which eventually ended in a 2–3 loss for Guingamp.

Personal life 
Roux is a fan of Spain international and FC Barcelona veteran, Sergio Busquets.

Career statistics

References

External links 
 
 Baptiste Roux at EA Guingamp
 

1999 births
Living people
People from Bressuire
Sportspeople from Deux-Sèvres
French footballers
Footballers from Nouvelle-Aquitaine
Association football midfielders
Ligue 2 players
En Avant Guingamp players